Thomson River may refer to:

Places 
Thomson River (Queensland), western Queensland, Australia
Thomson River (Victoria), Victoria, Australia

See also 
Thompson River, British Columbia, Canada
Thompson River (Missouri)
Thompson River (Montana)